The Toyota TOM'S Celica C, also known as the TOM'S 82C, was a Group C sports prototype race car, designed, developed, and built by Toyota, in collaboration and partnership with TOM'S, for sports car racing, in 1982. It was based on the regular Toyota Celica car.

References

Group C cars
82C